Digger Creek is a stream in the U.S. state of California. The stream flows for  before it empties into North Fork Battle Creek.

The creek was named after the Digger Indians.

References

Rivers of California
Rivers of Shasta County, California
Rivers of Tehama County, California